Schmit is a surname. Notable people with the surname include:

Ady Schmit (born 1940), Luxembourgish footballer and manager
Crazy Schmit (1866–1940), American baseball player
Donny Schmit (1967–1996), American motorcycle racer
Édouard Schmit (born 1930), Luxembourgish fencer
Étienne Schmit (1889–1937), Luxembourgish politician and jurist
Jean Schmit (1931–2010), Luxembourgish cyclist
Lydie Schmit (1939–1988), Luxembourgish politician and educator
Marc Schmit (born 1985), Luxembourgish sailor
Mariette Schmit (born 1953), Luxembourgish fencer
Matt Schmit, American politician
Nicolas Schmit (born 1953), Luxembourgish politician
Patrick Schmit (born 1974), Luxembourgish figure skater
Summer Schmit (born 2003), American Paralympic swimmer
Timothy B. Schmit (born 1947), American musician and songwriter
Tomas Schmit (1943–2006), German artist and writer

See also
Schmitt (disambiguation)
Schmidt (disambiguation)